The 1975-76 American Basketball Association season saw the Spirits of St. Louis, led by Marvin Barnes, Moses Malone, Ron Boone and Caldwell Jones, drop to sixth place in the ABA, with a record of 35-49.  As a result, the Spirits missed the playoffs in their second and final season.

Offseason

Draft picks

Preseason transactions

Don Chaney of the Boston Celtics, signed in September 1974 to a three-year contract starting with the 1975-76 season, joined the Spirits
Rod Thorn hired as head coach
M.L. Carr signed as a free agent, July 31, 1975

Preseason exhibition games

Like most ABA teams, the Spirits of St. Louis played preseason exhibition games against NBA squads.

On October 8, 1975, the Spirits for the first time faced their in-state rivals, the Kansas City Kings, in Columbia, Missouri.  Marvin Barnes had 24 points and 14 rebounds for the Spirits; Nate Archibald had 24 points for the Kings.  The Spirits won, 95-90.

On October 17, 1975, the Spirits and Kings met again, this time in Kiel Auditorium in St. Louis.  The Kings won the rematch, 114-108.

On October 18, 1975, in Carbondale, Illinois, the Spirits played the Philadelphia 76ers.  St. Louis' Maurice Lucas had 21 points and 15 rebounds; Philadelphia's Billy Cunningham - who had played in the ABA for the team the Spirits displaced, the Carolina Cougars - led the 76ers with 15 points.  The Spirits won, 107-91, in what would be their final game against an NBA team.

Regular season

Roster

10   Don Adams
24  Marvin Barnes
34  Mike Barr
30  M.L. Carr
45  Randy Denton
1  Ron Boone
10  Mike D'Antoni
22  Gus Gerard
12  Don Chaney
14  Freddie Lewis
20  Maurice Lucas
40  Barry Parkhill
13  Moses Malone
3  Caldwell Jones
45  Paul Ruffner
42  Steve Green

Season standings

Month by Month

October 1975

On October 24, 1975, the Spirits opened their season before 5,003 fans at home against the New York Nets.  New York's Julius Erving led all scorers with 27 points and the Nets won 109-94.  The next night in Denver the Spirits lost to the Denver Nuggets 108-101; 12,202 saw David Thompson put in a game-high 33.  The following night, October 26, 1975, the Spirits gained their first victory of the season, before only 1,144 fans in St. Louis.  Maurice Lucas' game-high 25 points led the Spirits past the San Diego Sails 101-85.

On October 29, 1975, the visiting Spirits won at Hampton Roads, Virginia, against the Virginia Squires, 104-100 in overtime.  Willie Wise led all scorers with 38.  The Spirits closed out the month on October 31 with a road game against the New York Nets which the Spirits won 120-116 in their second overtime game in a row, in spite of Julius Erving's game-best 42 point performance.  The Spirits entered the second month of the season with a 3-2 record.

November 1975

December 1975

January 1976

February 1976

March 1976

April 1976

On April 2, 1976, though no one knew it at the time, the Spirits notched the final victory in team history with a 110-109 victory over the Virginia Squires.  St. Louis' home crowd was only 1,388; Ticky Burden led all scorers with 28.  The next night in Louisville the Spirits lost 106-102 to the Kentucky Colonels.  5,190 fans saw Artis Gilmore lead all scorers with 28 points.  The next night, April 4, 1976, though unbeknownst to anyone at the time, the Spirits played their final home game, drawing 2,010 fans for a close overtime loss to the Kentucky Colonels, 106-105.  Moses Malone led all scorers with 32 points.

On April 6, 1976, the Spirits played the final game in the team's history, losing in Hampton Roads to the Virginia Squires, 120-116, before 2,448 fans.  Mike Green was the game's leading scorer with 25.

Player statistics

Legend

Season

Playoffs

Awards and records

Awards

Marvin Barnes, 1976 ABA All-Star Game
Ron Boone, 1976 ABA All-Star Game
Maurice Lucas, 1976 ABA All-Star Game
M. L. Carr, 1976 ABA All-Rookie Team

Records

On November 9, 1975, the homestanding Spirits faced the San Diego Sails in what turned out to be the final game in Sails franchise history. St. Louis won, 95-92, before only 1,194 fans.
On November 29, 1975, the visiting Spirits faced the Utah Stars in what turned out to be the final game in Stars history.  Utah won, 136-100, before 4,683 fans.
On March 5, 1976 David Thompson of the Denver Nuggets, against the Spirits, set an ABA record with 21 points in the first quarter.  Denver won at home 137-125; attendance was 13,522.
On March 10, 1976, against the Spirits, the New York Nets' Jim Eakins had his consecutive game streak ended at 490.  St. Louis won at home, 99-95, before 7,702 fans.

Transactions

Draft and preseason signings

Trades

Moses Malone, Ron Boone, Randy Denton and Steve Green purchased from the Utah Stars, December 2, 1975
Gus Gerard sold to the Denver Nuggets, December 18, 1975
Rod Thorn, with a 20-27 record, replaced as head coach by Joe Mullaney
Maurice Lucas traded to the Kentucky Colonels for Caldwell Jones, December 17, 1975

Legacy and aftermath

In May 1976, due to attendance problems in St. Louis and with the ABA-NBA merger pending, the Spirits announced that they were going to move to Salt Lake City, Utah, to play as the Utah Rockies when a lease agreement for the Salt Palace was arranged.  This followed an attempted merger of the Spirits and the Utah Stars franchise during the 1975-76 season, a merger that, had it occurred, contemplated the team leaving St. Louis for Utah.  In another effort to be included in the ABA-NBA merger, the Silna brothers proposed selling the Spirits to a Utah group, buying the Kentucky Colonels franchise, and moving the Colonels to Buffalo to replace the Buffalo Braves, who were then planning to move to Hollywood, Florida.

The Spirits were not included in the ABA-NBA merger, but the Silna brothers nonetheless managed to turn it into one of the greatest deals in the history of professional sports.<ref name="seattlepi.nwsource.com">[http://www.seattlepi.com/basketball/271843_deal27.html Enterprising brothers converted NBA buyout of ABA team into multimillion-dollar windfall, Eddie Pells, Associated Press, Saturday, May 27, 2006]</ref> In June 1976 the ABA owners agreed, in return for the Spirits of St. Louis ceasing operations, to pay the St. Louis owners $2.2 million in cash up front in addition to a 1/7 share of the four remaining teams' television revenues in perpetuity''.  As the NBA's popularity exploded in 1980s and 1990s, the league's television rights were sold to CBS and then NBC, and additional deals were struck with the TNT and TBS cable networks; league television revenue soared into the hundreds of millions of dollars.  Over the past 25 years, the Silnas have collected approximately $100 million from the NBA, despite the fact that the Spirits never played an NBA game. The Silnas continue to receive checks from the NBA on a yearly basis, representing a 4/7 share of the television money that would normally go to any NBA franchise, or roughly two percent of the entire league's TV money.  Thanks to their deal during the ABA-NBA merger the Silnas made millions through 1980s and at least $4.4 million per year through 1990s.  From 1999 through 2002 the deal netted the Spirits' owners at least $12.53 million per year; from 2003-2006 their take was at least $15.6 million per year.  The two Silna brothers each get 45% of that television revenue per year and their attorney during the merger negotiations, Donald Schupak, receives 10%.  They credit their terrific deal to planning they had done ahead of the merger for the Virginia Squires owners; the Silnas had expected the Spirits and Colonels to enter the NBA but for the ailing Squires to be left out, and the Silnas thought up the television revenue deal as a way to treat the Squires' owners fairly if the Squires did not join the NBA with the other ABA teams.

ABA dispersal draft
The ABA–NBA merger terms included the St. Louis (and Kentucky) players being put into a special dispersal draft. Marvin Barnes went to the Detroit Pistons for $500,000, Moses Malone went to the Portland Trail Blazers for $300,000, Ron Boone went to the Kansas City Kings for $250,000, Randy Denton went to the New York Knicks for $50,000 and Mike Barr also went to the Kansas City, for $15,000.

The folding of the Spirits dissolved a very talented basketball team, one that likely would have competed successfully in the NBA. Twelve players from the final two Spirits of St. Louis rosters (1974–76) played in the NBA during the 1976–77 season and beyond: Maurice Lucas, Ron Boone, Marvin Barnes, Caldwell Jones, Lonnie Shelton, Steve Green, Gus Gerard, Moses Malone Don Adams, Don Chaney, M. L. Carr and Freddie Lewis.  However, the deal cut by the Silna brothers and the incredible amount of revenue it has produced over the years has itself become legend.

References

1974-75 Spirits of St. Louis on Basketball Reference

External links 
RememberTheABA.com 1975-76 regular season and playoff results
RememberTheABA.com Spirits of St. Louis page

Spirits
Spirits of St. Louis